Anna Polina (born 11 September 1989, in Leningrad) is a Russian-French pornographic actress and model.

Career
Anna debuted in the adult industry in 2010; since then she has appeared in over 30 productions.

In 2010, Anna starred in the independent horror film Echap. In 2011 she appeared in two television documentaries about adult industry, France 2's Le Rhabillage and Direct 8's Star du X, comment en sortir indemne ?. In April 2012 she appeared in a campaign for the breast cancer prevention. She also appeared in advertisements of Yamaha number 69 driven by Hugo Payen in the 2012 Dakar Rally.

Awards and nominations

References

Further reading

External links

1989 births
Living people
Actresses from Saint Petersburg
Russian pornographic film actresses
French pornographic film actresses
French people of Russian descent